Cass Ole (March 6, 1969 - June 29, 1993) was a Texan-bred Arabian stallion. Originally bred to be a show horse, he was National Champion in Arabian Western Pleasure in 1975, National Reserve Champion Arabian Ladies Side Saddle in 1976, and U.S. Top Ten Arabian English Pleasure in both 1975 and 1976. He won over 50 championships and over 20 Reserve Championships in his seven-year show career and was high point winner of the King Saud Trophy of the American Horse Show Association (now United States Equestrian Federation). 

Cass Ole played The Black in the films The Black Stallion and The Black Stallion Returns, in which he is credited as Cass-Olé.

The Black Stallion
Horse trainers Glenn Randall and his sons J.R. and Corky Randall began their international search for a black Arabian to play The Black in the upcoming film. They found Cass Ole at his ranch in San Antonio, and his temperament and appearance suited him for the role. His owners stipulated that he was not to be used in the running or swimming scenes, so three other horses were obtained for use in those shots, as well as for stunts. Cass Ole and his fellow horse actors trained at a California ranch for several weeks before filming began. He had sessions with the young actor in the lead role, Kelly Reno, so the two could become familiar and get used to working with one another. 

Cass Ole was naturally a black-colored horse, but he had white markings on his pasterns and a white star on his forehead which were dyed black for his screen time. (In the 2003 IMAX film, The Young Black Stallion, the horse cast for the role was actually a bay and his entire coat was dyed black.) 

The stallion was born at Donoghue Arabian Horse Farm in Goliad, Texas, owned by the late Louise and Gerald Donoghue, who sold him to his owners in San Antonio who purchased him for showing with their daughter. The Donoghue's were usually reluctant to sell stallions for girls to show,  but the young rider was such an exceptional horsewoman they made an exception. Cass Ole's sire was Cassanova, a Donoghue Arabian, accounting for the name Cass Ole', a combination of the sire and dam's registered names.

His mane as seen in the two movies was partially enhanced. Like many American horses, Cass Ole had his mane trimmed into a bridle path. While he did have a long mane typical for his breed, its natural length was about equal to the width of his neck, which is the average maximum length that a horse's mane will grow when not specially groomed. Therefore, to hide his bridle path trimming and to create the long flowing mane that was seen in the movie itself, hair extensions were stitched into his mane to provide a fuller and longer look on camera. To grow a mane past its natural length requires it to be kept in braids, regularly conditioned, takes at least a year's time to achieve significant length, and, like humans, some horses' manes simply will not grow beyond a certain length.

Later life

After the two films had been released Cass Ole became a celebrity, showing up to be admired at fundraisers and special events. In 1980 he won the Humane Society Award for The Prevention of Cruelty To Animals at the International Horse Show in Washington, D.C. He visited the White House and was present at the Inauguration of President Reagan. He performed before audiences in Italy, Sardinia, Algeria, and Morocco. His last performance took place in the Tacoma Dome in Tacoma, Washington.  His retirement show was under the direction of professional horse trainer George Gipson of Tenaha, Texas.  He stood at stud at his home ranch in Texas, siring over 130 foals. None of them grew up to match his success. 

Cass Ole was euthanized in 1993 after suffering from severe colic.

External links
The Movie: The Black Stallion

1969 animal births
1993 animal deaths
Individual Arabian and part-Arabian horses
Horses in film and television
Horse actors